Patricia "Patty" A. Lundstrom (born February 6, 1959) is an American politician and a Democratic member of the New Mexico House of Representatives representing District 9 since January 2003. Lundstrom served consecutively from January 2001 until January 2003 in the District 5 seat.

Elections
 2012 Lundstrom was unopposed for both the June 5, 2012 Democratic Primary, winning with 2,069 votes and the November 6, 2012 General election, winning with 6,246 votes.
 2000 When District 5 incumbent Democratic Representative R. David Peterson ran for New Mexico Senate and left the seat open, Lundstrom ran in the 2000 Democratic Primary, winning with 1,583 votes (56%) and won the November 7, 2000 General election with 4,087 votes (67.4%) against Republican nominee Daniel Kruis.
 2002 Redistricted to District 9, Lundstrom faced fellow Democratic Representative Leo Watchman in the 2002 Democratic Primary; she won with 1,445 votes (70.3%) and was unopposed for the November 5, 2002 General election, winning with 3,330 votes.
 2004 Lundstrom was unopposed for the June 1, 2004 Democratic Primary, winning with 1,625 votes and won the November 2, 2004 General election with 5,304 votes (67.5%) against Republican nominee Michael Pyles.
 2006 Lundstrom was unopposed for both the June 6, 2006 Democratic Primary, winning with 1,755 votes and the November 7, 2006 General election, winning with 5,007 votes.
 2008 Lundstrom was challenged in the June 8, 2008 Democratic Primary, winning with 1,861 votes and was unopposed for the November 4, 2008 General election, winning with 6,511 votes.
 2010 Lundstrom was challenged for the June 1, 2010 Democratic Primary, winning with 1,559 votes (67.4%) and was unopposed for the November 2, 2010 General election, winning with 4,340 votes.

References

External links
  Representative Patricia A. Lundstrom - (D) at the New Mexico Legislature
 
 Patricia Lundstrom at Ballotpedia
 Patricia Patty A. Lundstrom at the National Institute on Money in State Politics

Place of birth missing (living people)
1959 births
Living people
Democratic Party members of the New Mexico House of Representatives
People from Gallup, New Mexico
Women state legislators in New Mexico
21st-century American politicians
21st-century American women politicians